Merbok is a mukim in Kuala Muda District, Kedah, Malaysia. The historical Bujang Valley is located here. It is also the location for the Universiti Teknologi MARA Kedah Campus (UiTM Merbok/Sungai Petani).

Etymology
The town derived its name from an archaic Langkasuka-Malay language, which means "the declaratory place". Based on the ancient Hikayat Merong Mahawangsa, the declaration of Islam being the state religion of the Kedah Kingdom was done in Merbok estuary port, which situated close to the kingdom's capital during the area, Bukit Meriam (Cannon Hill). This is in contrast from the popular belief that the name owed its origin from the local burung merbok (zebra dove).

External links
 Suara burung website 
 Suara burung website 

Kuala Muda District
Mukims of Kedah